Raymond Koh  Keng Joo (Chinese: 许景裕) (born 2 November 1954, Johor Bahru) is a Christian pastor from Malaysia who was abducted by the Royal Malaysia Police on 13 February 2017. As of August 2022, Koh was still missing with no further information.

Background
Raymond Koh was a Malaysian Christian pastor in Malaysia who ran a non-governmental organization focusing on people living with HIV/AIDs, recovering addicts, single mothers and children. Local Islamic authorities once investigated his organization over allegations that the group was working to convert Muslims to Christianity through its various social and charitable endeavors. Proselytisation to Muslims is illegal in several Malaysia states. Koh is married to Susanna Liew.

Kidnapping
On 13 February 2017, Koh was abducted by a group of men in Petaling Jaya while on his way to a friend's house. It was captured on CCTV that at least 15 men in three black SUVs were part of the abduction. The Human Rights Commission of Malaysia concluded that these men were working for the Special Branch of the Royal Malaysia Police.

Investigation
Police arrested a man as part of investigations into the extortion of Koh's family, and later obtained an extension of his remand. However, the police say there is no clue to the pastor's whereabouts.

The then Inspector-General of Police, Khalid Abu Bakar, said authorities were investigating three possibilities: the first being the pastor’s personal issues, second being extremist activities and third being kidnap-for-ransom.

There are possible links to Koh's role as a Christian activist at a time when Malaysia is moving to enforce stricter Islamic laws. The pastor was involved in a controversy in 2011, after being accused of proselytising Muslims. A box containing two bullets, with a note in written in Malay threatening his life, had been sent to Koh's house.

Responses
Wan Azizah Wan Ismail, the Leader of the Opposition, compared Koh's abduction to that of another social activist, Amri Che Mat, who went missing in November 2016.  Human rights group Hakam expressed concern over the apparent abduction of another pastor, Joshua Hilmi, and his wife Ruth who also went missing in November 2016.

Following the Human Rights Commission of Malaysia's (SUHAKAM) announcement that its findings concluded that the Malaysian Special Branch (SB) was responsible for the disappearances of Amri and Raymond, and still missing as of 2019, acting Deputy Inspector-General of Police (DIG) Abdul Hamid Bador rapped SUHAKAM for causing negative impact towards the Royal Malaysian Police (PDRM). Abdul Hamid added that he was confident that Inspector-General of Police (IGP) Mohamad Fuzi Harun, then SB Director, would provide an answer to the allegations. Prime Minister of Malaysia Mahathir Mohamad announced on the same day that fresh investigations would be conducted once Mohamad Fuzi retires in May 2019.

In late November 2020, the United States Commission on International Religious Freedom's Commissioner Jim Carr adopted Koh into the Commission's Religious Prisoners of Conscience Project. Carr urged the Malaysian Government to deliver on its promise to investigate the circumstances of Koh's abduction, and ensure his wellbeing and safe return home.

See also
 Amri Che Mat
 List of people who disappeared

References 

1950s births
2010s missing person cases
Enforced disappearances in Malaysia
Malaysian activists
Malaysian Christians
Missing people
Missing person cases in Malaysia
Living people
People from Johor Bahru
Political activists